James John Purdie (24 May 1918 – 29 February 1988) was an English professional footballer who played in the Football League for Millwall, Aldershot and Southport as a goalkeeper. He also played in the Scottish League for Kilmarnock and Airdrieonians.

Career statistics

References 

1918 births
1988 deaths
People from Berwick-upon-Tweed
English footballers
Association football goalkeepers
Airdrieonians F.C. (1878) players
Millwall F.C. players
Kilmarnock F.C. players
Southport F.C. players
Tonbridge Angels F.C. players
Aldershot F.C. players
Chelmsford City F.C. players
English Football League players
Southern Football League players
Scottish Football League players
Brentford F.C. wartime guest players
Bradford (Park Avenue) A.F.C. players
Footballers from Northumberland